Lunatic is the fifth album by French rapper Booba and released on 22 November 2010 on Tallac Records. It's named after his former hip hop duo Lunatic, with Ali.

Track listing

External links 
 Website
 Blog
 MySpace
 Dailymotion

2010 albums
Booba albums
Albums produced by Ryan Leslie
Albums produced by Cool & Dre
Albums produced by the Runners